Buford's Beach Bunnies is a 1993 American comedy film, starring Jim Hanks.

Plot
Jim Hanks plays Jeeter Buford, the son of fast-food mogul Harry Buford. Jeeter will inherit his father's company only if he can overcome his lifelong fear of women. When Harry offers $100,000 to the first of his female employees who can woo his son, the competition begins.

Cast
 Jim Hanks as Jeeter Buford
Henry Capanna as Young Jeeter Buford
 Rikki Brando as Lauren Beatty
 Monique Parent as Amber Dexterous
 Dave Robinson as The Amazing Foreskin / Santa Claus
 Charley Rossman as Scud Blackplowman
 Suzanne Ager as Boopsie Underall
 Barrett Cooper as Harry Buford 
 Ina Rogers as Beula Lugosi
 Jerry Rector as Karl
 Robyn Blythe as Dr. Van Horney 
 Bettina Brancato as Miss Chester
 David Damien as Manuel
 Aaron Atinsky as Billy
 John Callan as Peter
 Steven Faupel as Bud
 Tony Gaetano as Bogart
 Stephanie Anderson as Marilyn
 Jefferson Wagner as Clint
 Lisa Fernandez as Miss Heatley
 Avery Waisbren as Sergeant Pepper
 Richard Derby Attwill as Judge Rhinehole 
 Richard Cerenko as Ambrose Chaser
 Jonathan Fahn as Prosecutor
 Kitten Natividad as Madam #1
 Linda Honeyman as Madam #2
 Diane Fornier as Prostitute
 Avalon Anders as Santa's Helper
 Lissa Walters as Porn Actress 
 Mark Pirro as Porn Actor

References

External links
 
 

1990s sex comedy films
1993 films
American sex comedy films
Beach party films
Teen sex comedy films
1993 comedy films
1990s English-language films
1990s American films